Livar (also Romanized as Līvār; also known as Līvār-e Bālā) is a village in Zolbin Rural District, Yamchi District, Marand County, East Azerbaijan Province, Iran. At the 2006 census, its population was 2,187, in 558 families.

References 

Populated places in Marand County